The Mental Health (Care and Treatment) (Scotland) Act 2003, which came into effect on 5 October 2005, is an Act of the Scottish Parliament that enables medical professionals to legally detain and treat people against their will on the grounds of mental disorders, with the Mental Health Tribunal for Scotland and the Mental Welfare Commission for Scotland providing safeguards against mistreatment. 

It largely replaces the Mental Health (Scotland) Act 1984.

Detention certificates 
The act provides for short-term detention certificates and emergency detention certificates.

Short-term certificates are referred to by the act as the 'preferred gateway' to detention, and should lead to up to 28 days' detention during which period, treatment may be administered against the will of the detainee, but can also lead to compulsory treatment orders, which may have longer term implications for the detainee's future liberty.

Detainees can apply to the Mental Health Tribunal for revocation of short-term certificates.

Emergency certificates lead, notionally, to up to 72 hours' detention, and can also lead to detentions under short-term certificates.

Emergency certificates do not enable treatment against the will of detainees, except for urgent treatment, and there is no formal process of appeal against them.

Unless a certificate is completed for someone who is already in a mental health hospital, both forms of detention are preceded by detention of up to 72 hours in what are called 'places of safety', while transport to hospital is arranged.

Also, short-term detentions may be extended for periods of up to three 'working days', to facilitate applications to the Mental Health Tribunal for compulsory treatment orders.

Saturdays, Sundays and Scottish bank holidays are not counted as working days.

Principles
The law is based on a set of principles. These principles should be taken into account by anyone involved in a person's care and treatment.

Past and present wishes
Patients should be given the information and support they need to take part in decisions about their care and treatment. To help service users get their views across, the Act puts in place the right to access independent advocacy services. It also puts in place advance statements as a way to help service users say what care and treatment they would and would not want to have. The Mental Health Commission in Scotland examines cases where a person's advance statement has been overridden.

The views of any carer, guardian or welfare attorney
Carers should be involved in decision-making and should be given information they need to help them in their role. We will be developing guidance this year to help service providers and carers with the problem of patient confidentiality and sharing information.

Options
A patient's care plan should reflect their needs as an individual. A Mental Health Tribunal reviews care that looks for a compulsory treatment order that lasts longer than 2 years or the service users can request this if they wish to appeal a compulsory treatment order after 3 months.

The care and treatment that will be of most benefit
This should be reflected in a care plan. In addition the Act puts in place safeguards when consent to treatment has not been given.

Individual abilities and background
Important things about a person such as their age, gender, sexual orientation, religion, racial origin or membership of any ethnic group should be taken into account by people providing care and treatment.

People providing care should also make sure that:
 any restrictions on a person's freedom are the least necessary
 the person being treated under the act shouldn't be treated any less favourably than anyone else being treated for a mental illness, or other mental disorder
 carer's needs are taken into account
 the person being treated is getting services that are right for them
 when a person is no longer receiving compulsory treatment, he or she should still continue to get care and treatment if it is needed
 if the person being treated is under 18, his or her welfare is of the highest priority

See also
List of Acts of the Scottish Parliament from 1999
Mental Health (Public Safety and Appeals) (Scotland) Act 1999

References

External links

Acts of the Scottish Parliament 2003
Mental health law in the United Kingdom
Mental health in Scotland
Health law in Scotland